Lene Tiemroth (16 July 1943 – 3 November 2016) was a Danish actress.

Background and career 
Tiemroth was born in Copenhagen, Denmark, the daughter of actors Edvin Tiemroth and Clara Østø. She graduated from the Royal Danish Theatre's Student School in 1966. She then briefly affiliated with the Det Ny Teater before she traveled to the United States to try her luck, though this primarily came to consist of various recordings of drama schools.

Among the many plays she has appeared include Hedda Gabler, Electra, Cabaret, Macbeth, Uncle Vanya, Threepenny Opera, Faderen and Glasmenageriet. For several years she taught at the Danish National School of Theatre and Contemporary Dance
and has been an assistant director on television.

In 2001, she received a Bodil Award for Best Actress in a Supporting Role for her involvement in Italian for Beginners. She died on 3 November 2016 at the age of 73.

Filmography 
Film excerpts:
 Pigen og greven – 1966
  – 1968
  – 1983
 Hip Hip Hurrah! – 1987
 Italian for Beginners – 2000
  – 2004
 Afgrunden – 2004

References 

1943 births
2016 deaths
People from Copenhagen
Danish actresses
Best Supporting Actress Bodil Award winners